The men's team pursuit competition at the 2018 UEC European Track Championships was held on 2 and 3 August 2018.

Results

Qualifying
The eight fastest teams advanced to the first round.

First round
First round heats were held as follows:
Heat 1: 6th v 7th fastest
Heat 2: 5th v 8th fastest
Heat 3: 2nd v 3rd fastest
Heat 4: 1st v 4th fastest

The winners of heats 3 and 4 proceeded to the gold medal race. The remaining six teams were ranked on time, from which the top two proceeded to the bronze medal race.

 QG = qualified for gold medal final
 QB = qualified for bronze medal final

Finals

References

Men's team pursuit
European Track Championships – Men's team pursuit